Acanthodactylus yemenicus, known commonly as the Yemen fringe-fingered lizard, the Yemen fringe-toed lizard, or the Yemen spiny-toed lizard, is a species of lizard in the family Lacertidae. The species is endemic to Yemen.

Habitat
The preferred habitats of A. yemenicus are desert and rocky areas such as cliffs and mountain peaks.

Reproduction
A. yemenicus is oviparous.

References

Further reading
Salvador, Alfredo (1982). "A revision of the lizards of the genus Acanthodactylus (Sauria: Lacertidae)". Bonner Zoologische Monographien (16): 1-67. (Acanthodactylus yemenicus, new species, pp. 53–57, Figures 20–22, Map 10). (in English, with an abstract in German).
Sindaco, Roberto; Jeremčenko, Valery K. (2008). The Reptiles of the Western Palearctic: 1. Annotated Checklist and Distributional Atlas of the Turtles, Crocodiles, Amphisbaenians and Lizards of Europe, North Africa, Middle East and Central Asia. (Monographs of the Societas Herpetologica Italica). Latina, Italy: Edizioni Belvedere. 580 pp. .

Acanthodactylus
Lizards of Asia
Reptiles of the Arabian Peninsula
Endemic fauna of Yemen
Reptiles described in 1982
Taxa named by Alfredo Salvador (herpetologist)